I Never Die is the first studio album by South Korean girl group (G)I-dle, released by Cube Entertainment on March 14, 2022. It contains eight tracks, including the lead single "Tomboy", and marked the group's first release as a quintet following the departure of member Soojin in August 2021.

Background and release
In January 2021, the group released their fourth extended play I Burn, which detailed the various emotions experienced during the process of finding happiness after separation. It received generally positive reviews from contemporary critics. It debuted at number three on the Gaon Album Chart, becoming the group's fifth top ten album in the country, and scored their best opening-week sales, selling 115,500 copies. The EP also marked as their final release as a sextet before Soojin's hiatus and subsequent departure from the group in August 2021.

In an interview with E-Daily, Miyeon revealed that (G)I-dle might be promoting as a group "sooner than fans expect" and that they "will show you lots of new and cool sides of ourselves this year". On February 17, 2022 Cube Entertainment stated that the group was preparing to release new music in March. On February 24, 2022, the label announced that (G)I-dle would be releasing their first studio album, titled I Never Die, on March 14. On February 25, a black-and-white comeback trailer was released. On February 28, the track listing was revealed, with "Tomboy" announced as the lead single, followed by a lyric poster on March 1. Concept photos were released on March 2, 3 and 4. An audio snippet was published on March 7, with music video teasers on March 11 and 12. I Never Die was released worldwide on March 14, 2022 through Cube Entertainment, in conjunction with a music video for "Tomboy".

Composition

Music and lyrics
The standard edition of I Never Die is twenty-four minutes long, consisting of eight tracks. The CD adds an explicit version of "Tomboy". The majority of the album, including the lead single, was co-written and produced by member Soyeon. Yuqi participated in the creation of "Liar" and "Polaroid", while Minnie contributed to "Already" and "Escape". I Never Die is primarily a pop record with influences of alternative rock, rock, R&B, and hip hop. The album focuses on speaking out against prejudices and exuding self-confidence. It is divided into three concepts: "RiSKY", "a very close noir concept"; "CHiLL", a "relaxed and cool revenge squad concept"; and "SPOiLED", which "expresses a protagonist who you can’t hate even though it’s arbit".

Songs
The opening track "Tomboy" is a grimy, empowering alternative rock, rock and pop-punk song about independence and breaking the "perfect girlfriend" stereotype. The track is set to reverberating guitar riffs and drum beats with lyrics such as "I'm not a doll", and "Just me I-DLE". "Never Stop Me" is a rock-leaning song with 2000s emo-teen influences that expresses the feelings of a breakup. In the third track "Villain Dies", the group "proudly embrace their darker side". It is a dark electro-pop song that also combines hip hop and rock with "ominous" violin. "Already" is a soft R&B and pop acknowledgement song that just "because there's been healing, [it] doesn’t mean [that] the scars have disappeared altogether". The fifth track "Polaroid" is a mesmerizing and nostalgic R&B song with a heartwarming message about (G)I-dle's desire to live in the moment and capture their youth in their memories like they would capture something in a polaroid photo. "Escape" was made for "those who become tired of everything and feel like giving up, as this will provide warm consolation and care". "Liar" is a classic rock song with electric guitar. It presents the "spirited act" of the group standing up for themselves and realizing that it is better to let a bad thing go. The "bombastic" and "proud" closing track "My Bag" is a climactic song where all members show off their rapping prowess against a hip-hop instrumental.

Promotion
On February 24, 2022, Cube Entertainment announced on their social media accounts that the group would be releasing their first studio album titled I Never Die on March 14. Preorders for the album began the same day. On February 28, the group revealed the album's track listing, with "Tomboy" as the lead single of the album. On March 8, 2022, (G)I-dle released a one-minute-long video for the track "My Bag", where they are accompanied by a team of backup dancers in the middle of an empty road, racing in flashy white sports cars. I Never Die was released on March 14, 2022, to retail stores, digital music and streaming platforms, as well as on the band's website. Prior to the album's release, on March 14, 2022, the group held an online showcase event to introduce the album, communicate with their fans and perform songs from I Never Die.

The group performed "Tomboy" on Mnet's M Countdown on March 17, KBS's Music Bank on March 18, MBC's Show! Music Core on March 19, and SBS's Inkigayo on March 20.

Accolades

Track listing

Credits and personnel
Credits adapted from album liner notes.

Musicians

 (G)I-dle – vocals 
 Soyeon – background vocals , lyrics , composition , arrangement ,
 Minnie – composition , arrangement , background vocal 
 Yuqi – composition , arrangement , background vocal 
 Pop Time – composition , arrangement 
 Jenci – composition , arrangement , background vocal , keyboard 
 Kako – composition , arrangement , background vocal 
 The Proof – composition , arrangement , drum , synthesizer 
 Houdini – composition , arrangement , background vocal , guitar , bass , drum programming , keyboard 
 Boytoy (Blatinum) – lyrics , composition , arrangement , bass 
 PLZ (Blatinum) – lyrics , composition , arrangement 
 BreadBeat – lyrics , composition , arrangement , piano , synthesizer 
 Siixk Jun – lyrics , composition , arrangement , piano 
 Kim Myong-kyu – composition , arrangement , guitar , bass 
 Nathan – composition , keyboard 
 Flip_00 – arrangement , drum 
 Jeon Jae-hee – background vocal 
 Lee So-hyun – background vocal 
 Perrie – background vocal 
 Kim Ho-hyun – guitar 
 EOMT – guitar 
 Kim Myung-gyu – guitar 
 Lim Hyunqi – acoustic guitar 
 Lee Ji-ho – electric guitar 
 Park Ji-young – keyboard 
 Kim So-hoon – keyboard 
 Oh Song-ji – keyboard 
 Kim Mi-geum – keyboard 
 Choi In-seong – bass 
 Yang Chae-ni – piano 
 Kim Seung-nam – drum 
 Baek Min-sung – drum 

Technical

 Yang Young-eun – recording 
 Choi Ye-ji – recording 
 Shin Jae-bin – recording , mixing 
 Jung Eun-kyung  – digital editing 
 Kang Seon-young – mix engineering 
 Koo Jong-pil – mixing 
 Anchor – mixing 
 Kim Dae-sung – mixing 
 Kwon Nam-woo – mastering 
 Yoo Eun-jin – assistant mastering 

Locations
 Ingrid Studio – recording , digital editing 
 Cube Studio – recording , mixing 
 Klang Studio – mixing 
 Prismfilter Mix Lab – mixing 
 Tone Studio Seoul – mixing 
 821 Sound mastering – mastering , assistant mastering

Charts

Weekly charts

Monthly charts

Year-end charts

Certifications and sales

Release history

References

External links

2022 debut albums
(G)I-dle albums
Cube Entertainment albums
Pop albums by South Korean artists
Albums produced by Jeon So-yeon
Albums produced by Minnie (singer)
Albums produced by Song Yuqi